Rio Belongs to Us is a 2013 Brazilian drama-thriller film written and directed by Ricardo Pretti, starring Leandra Leal, Mariana Ximenes and Jiddu Pinheiro. It premiered at the 42nd International Film Festival Rotterdam.

The film is part of the "Operation Sonia Silk", a series of three feature-length films produced cooperatively, with the same cast and crew, co-produced by Canal Brasil and Teleimage.

Plot
After receiving a strange postcard, Marina, a 30-year-old woman, decides to return to Rio de Janeiro, her hometown, after an absence of 10 years. Marina doesn't know exactly why: she searches responses for the strange happenings, but everything appears to be increasingly confused.

Cast
 Leandra Leal 
 Mariana Ximenes 
 Jiddu Pinheiro

References

External links
 

Brazilian thriller drama films
2013 thriller drama films
2013 films
Films shot in Rio de Janeiro (city)
Films set in Rio de Janeiro (city)
2013 drama films
2010s Portuguese-language films